The following is a timeline of the history of Düsseldorf, Germany.

Prior to 19th century

 1186 – Counts of Berg in power.
 1285 – St. Sebastianus Bruderschaft Kaiserswerth (militia) formed.
 1288 – Town privileges granted by Adolf VIII of Berg.
 1316 – St.-Sebastianus-Schützenvereins Düsseldorf (militia) established.
 1385 – Residence of the Counts of Berg established in Düsseldorf.
 1567 – Rathhaus built.
 1609 – Residence of the Electoral Palatinate relocates to Düsseldorf from Heidelberg.
 1629 – Church of St. Andrew built.
 1684 – Evangelishche Kirche built.
 1710 – Electoral palace remodelled.
 1716
 Residence of the Electoral Palatinate relocates to Heidelberg.
 Neustadt laid out (approximate date).
 1760 – Jagerhof (electors' hunting lodge) built.
 1762 – Art Academy founded.
 1767 – Hofgarten laid out.
 1774 – School of Law established (approximate date).
 1787 – Karlstadt laid out.
 1794 – Town besieged by French forces.
 1800 – Musik-Academie established.

19th century
 1802 - Fortifications demolished.
 1804 – Kastanienallee laid out.
 1805
 Town becomes capital of Grand Duchy of Berg.
 Palace art collection relocates to Munich.
 1806 – French in power.
 1812 – Breidenbacher Hof in business.
 1813 – Hof-Garten expanded.
 1815
 Prussians in power.
 Engelbert Schramm becomes mayor.
 1818 – Lower Rhenish Music Festival held.
 1819 – New Kunstakademie Düsseldorf founded as Königlich Preußische Kunstakademie (Royal Prussian Academy of Art); Dusselthal Asylum established.
 1829 – Artists' Society for the Rhinelands and Westphalia (Kunstverein für die Rheinlande und Westphalen) founded.
 1838 – Bergisch-Märkische railway station opens.
 1841 – Düsseldorf–Elberfeld railway constructed.
 1845 – Cologne-Minden railway station opens.
 1846 – Ducal palace restored.
 1852
 August: Singing festival held.
 Population: 31,000.
 1861 – Malkasten artists' club established.
 1864 – Düsseldorfer Symphoniker (orchestra) active.
 1867 – Galerie Paffrath in business.

 1872 – Electoral palace burns down.
 1875
 Church of St. John built.
 City Theatre opens.
 1876
 Trams begin operating.
 Zoological Gardens established.
 1877 – Rhenish railway station built.
 1879 – Düsseldorf-Derendorf–Dortmund Süd railway, House of the Rhenish Estates, and Academy of Art building constructed.
 1881 – Kunsthalle built.
 1884 – Düsseldorf Exchange founded.
 1885
 City public library established.
  Population: 115,190.
 1891 – Düsseldorf Central Station opens.
 1893 – Mannesmann (manufacturer) relocates to Düsseldorf.
 1895 – Population: 175,985.
 1896 – Industrial art museum built.
 1898 – Road bridge constructed, carries the electric tram-line to "Crefeld".
 1899 – Apollo-Theater opens.
 1900 – Peek & Cloppenburg in business.

20th century

 1902 – Rhine Promenade laid out.
 1903 – Great Synagogue built.
 1904 – Löbbecke Museum opens.
 1905
 Schauspielhausgebäude (theatre) opens.
 Population: 252,630.
 1907 – Hospitals built.
 1909 – Ceramics museum founded.
 1910
 Königsallee Moving Pictures cinema opens.
 Largest Fair on the Rhine relocates to fairgrounds in Oberkassel district.
 1911 – Population: 312,000.
 1913 - Museum Kunstpalast opened in its current form.
 1920 – Labor strike.
 1921 – Max Planck Institute for Iron Research GmbH relocates to Düsseldorf.
 1924 – Wilhelm Marx House (high-rise) built.
 1926 – Planetarium and Rheinstadion built.
 1927 – Airport opens.
 1929 – Kaiserswerth becomes part of city.
 1935
 Robert Schumann Hochschule formed.
 Ice stadium opens on Brehmstraße.
 1936
 Düsseldorf Central Station rebuilt.
 1 October: Consulate of Poland relocated from Essen to Düsseldorf.

 1937
 Reich's Exhibition of a Productive People held.
 July: Nazi camp for Sinti and Romani people established (see also Porajmos).
 1943
 28 May: Kalkum forced labour camp established by the SS. Its prisoners were mostly Poles, Russians, Belgians, Dutchmen and Germans.
 1 November: Berta forced labour camp established by the SS. Its prisoners were mostly Russians, Poles, Czechs, Ukrainians, Lithuanians and Yugoslavs.
 1944
 March/April: DESt forced labour camp established by the SS. Its prisoners were mostly Poles, Russians, Belgians, Dutchmen and Germans.
 17 May: Kalkum, Berta and DESt forced labour camps converted into subcamps of the Buchenwald concentration camp.
 1 September: Berta II subcamp of the Buchenwald concentration camp established. Its prisoners were mostly Poles, Russians and Czechs.
 1945
 March: Berta, Berta II and DESt subcamps dissolved, prisoners deported to the main Buchenwald camp.
 10 April: Kalkum subcamp dissolved, prisoners deported to the main Buchenwald camp.
 16 April: German Resistance launches Aktion Rheinland.
 17 April: City taken by U.S. 97th Infantry Division.
 1946
 City becomes capital of North Rhine-Westphalia.
 Handelsblatt and Rheinische Post newspapers begin publication.
 1947
 28 March: Food protest.
 Kom(m)ödchen premieres.
 1950 – Institut Français Düsseldorf founded.
 1951 – Drupa printing equipment trade fair begins.
 1955
 February–March: City co-hosts the 1955 Ice Hockey World Championships.
 Deutsche Oper am Rhein established.
 1956 – Opernhaus Düsseldorf re-opens.
 1957 – North bridge constructed.
 1958 – New Synagogue built.
 1960
 Willi Becker becomes mayor.
 Dreischeibenhaus built.
 1961 – Kunstsammlung Nordrhein-Westfalen founded.
 1962 – Tausendfüßler bridge built.
 1965 – Marionetten-Theater housed in Palais Wittgenstein.
 1966 – University of Düsseldorf established.
 1967 – Kunsthalle Düsseldorf built.
 1968
 Düsseldorf Grand Prix tennis tournament begins.
 Komödie Düsseldorf founded.
 1969
 Düsseldorfer Schauspielhaus built.
 Düsseldorf Boat Show begins.
 1971
 Fachhochschule Düsseldorf founded.
 Philips Halle arena opens.
 1974 – Botanical garden established.
 1975 – City districts shaped (approximate date).
 1977 – City hosts the 1977 IAAF World Cross Country Championships.
 1979 – Tonhalle Düsseldorf and Flehe Bridge open.
 1981
 Düsseldorf Stadtbahn (light rail) begins operating.
 Rheinturm built.
 1982 – Collections Premieren Düsseldorf clothing trade fair begins.
 1984 – Von hier aus art exhibit held.
 1986 – Kunstsammlung Nordrhein-Westfalen building inaugurated.
 1987 – Aquazoo–Löbbecke Museum opens.
 1993
 Polish Institute founded.
 Rheinufer Tunnel opens.
 1994 – Schadow Arkaden shopping mall built.
 1996
 11 April: Düsseldorf Airport fire.
 Capitol Theater opens.
 1998 – Neuer Zollhof and Stadttor built.
 1999 – Joachim Erwin becomes mayor.
 2000 – Düsseldorf Airport railway station opens.

21st century

 2001
 Arag-Tower built.
 Museum Kunstpalast opens.
 2002 – Japan Day festival begins.
 2005
 Lichtburg Studio Theater opens.
 AMD Academy of Fashion and Design founded.
 2006 – ISS Dome arena opens.
 2007 – Kunst im Tunnel established.
 2008 – Dirk Elbers becomes mayor.
 2011
 Eurovision Song Contest 2011 held.
 Population: 592,393.
 2014 – June: Storm.
 2015 – General-Consulate of China opened.
 2017 – City hosts the 2017 World Table Tennis Championships.
 2018 – Honorary Consulate of Monaco opened.

See also
 Düsseldorf history
 List of mayors of Düsseldorf
 Timelines of other cities in the state of North Rhine-Westphalia:(de) Aachen, Bonn, Cologne, Dortmund, Duisburg, Essen, Münster

References

Bibliography

in English

in other languages

External links

 History of the city of Düsseldorf (in German)
 
 Links to fulltext city directories for Dusseldorf via Wikisource

Years in Germany
 
Dusseldorf
Dusseldorf